David Grant  (born 8 August 1956) is a British singer, comedian and vocal coach.

Career
Grant became famous in the early 1980s as a member of UK soul/funk duo, Linx, whose biggest hit was "Intuition" in 1981. He began a solo career in 1983 with the top 40 hit "Stop and Go". Further hits included  "Watching You Watching Me" and two duets with Jaki Graham, "Could It Be I'm Falling in Love" which reached number five in 1985 and the Todd Rundgren-penned "Mated", which made number 20 later that year. He has also worked as a session singer for artists including Diana Ross, Rick Astley and Lighthouse Family.

Grant has become well known, along with his second wife Carrie Grant, as vocal coach on Pop Idol; judge and vocal coach on the BBC TV talent show Fame Academy; and its spin-off Comic Relief Does Fame Academy. In addition he has worked with some of the UK's top pop acts including The Spice Girls, Take That, S Club, and more recently Will Young, Atomic Kitten, Melanie C, Lemar, Charlotte Church, Joss Stone, Geri Halliwell and Julian Perretta.

He also appeared regularly as a panellist on the Five topical debate show, The Wright Stuff. In 2006, he appeared in the four part BBC television series The Sound of Musicals. In September 2006 he appeared on BBC's MasterChef programme. At the start of 2008 Grant sat as a judge on the BBC One talent show The One and Only, where once again he worked alongside Carrie Grant.

Soon after, Grant starred as the celebrity 'hider' in an episode of the CBBC show Hider in the House. He is so far the only celebrity to have been 'discovered' in the first day's filming of the show. This appearance was a precursor to Grant and Carrie branching out into children's television later in the year, when they hosted their own CBeebies show Carrie and David's Popshop.

Grant often presented episodes of the BBC religious programme Songs of Praise.

Personal life
Grant and his wife Carrie have four children: Olive, Tylan, Arlo, and an adopted son, Nathan. All of their children are neurodivergent. Grant and Carrie are both Christian, and run a church plant in their home.
Grant was created a Member of the British Empire (MBE) by Elizabeth II in the 2019 New Years Honours List.

Discography

Albums

Singles

Filmography

References

External links
 
 
 Carrie and David Grant (BBC Radio London)

1956 births
Living people
20th-century Black British male singers
English pop singers
People from Hackney Central
British vocal coaches
Labour Party (UK) people
Members of the Order of the British Empire
English Christians